We're Not Married! is a 1952 American anthology romantic comedy film directed by Edmund Goulding. It was released by 20th Century Fox.

The screenplay was written by Nunnally Johnson, while the story was adapted by Dwight Taylor from Gina Kaus's and Jay Dratler's unpublished work "If I Could Remarry".

The film stars Victor Moore, Ginger Rogers, Fred Allen, Marilyn Monroe, David Wayne, Eve Arden, Paul Douglas, Eddie Bracken, and Mitzi Gaynor. Co-stars include Louis Calhern, Zsa Zsa Gabor, James Gleason, Paul Stewart, and Jane Darwell.

Plot 
When elderly Mr. Bush (Victor Moore) is appointed justice of the peace, he starts marrying couples on Christmas Eve. However, his appointment takes effect on the first of January. Later, this issue becomes known when one of the six couples he married files for divorce. To avoid a bigger scandal, the remaining five couples are informed that they are not really married. The film then shows how the other couples react to the news.

Steve (Fred Allen) and Ramona Gladwyn (Ginger Rogers) are a husband-and-wife radio team whose on-air loving behavior on their show "Breakfast with the Glad Gladwyns" conceals the fact that they cannot stand each other. However, they do not want to lose their large salaries. When they arrive outside the marriage license bureau, they encounter a happy couple leaving. The sight makes Steve reconsider his relationship with Ramona, then she does too.

The second couple is Jeff (David Wayne) and Annabel (Marilyn Monroe) Norris. Annabel has just won the "Mrs. Mississippi" pageant. Jeff is fed up with taking care of their child, while Annabel and her manager Duffy (James Gleason) are out preparing to compete for the title of "Mrs. America". Jeff is delighted at the prospect of getting Annabel back when he learns they are not married. He sees to it that she loses her title, but in the end is pleased when his now-fiancée wins the "Miss 
Mississippi" contest.

Bush remembers Hector (Paul Douglas) and Katie Woodruff (Eve Arden) talking constantly, but they have now run out of things to say to each other. When Hector gets the letter from the Governor's office, he imagines seeing all his gorgeous girlfriends again, then burns the letter before Katie sees it.

Kind millionaire Freddie Melrose (Louis Calhern) is married to a young gold-digger named Eve (Zsa Zsa Gabor). When Freddie goes on a business trip, she suggests she'll fly that evening to meet him at his hotel, but instead sets him up. Another woman shows up instead, followed shortly afterward by three men who witness his fake adultery. Eve and her attorney, Stone (Paul Stewart), inform Freddie that while Eve is entitled by law to half his assets in a divorce, they want much more, threatening him with criminal charges. Bush's letter arrives just in time to save him.

Young soldier Wilson "Willie" Fisher (Eddie Bracken) is about to be shipped out to Hawaii and the "Asiatic-Pacific Theater." At the train station, his wife Patsy (Mitzi Gaynor) arrives late and just has time to tell him she is pregnant before his train leaves. He is unable to tell her that they are not married. He sends her a telegram, urging her to meet him at the port. There, he goes AWOL in order to try to marry her, while dodging two MPs. However, he is caught and thrown in the brig, and his ship sets sail. Fortunately, a military chaplain notices an upset Patsy and manages to extract the story from her. He then arranges for her and Willie to get married by radio.

Cast 

 Victor Moore as  Melvin Bush, Justice of the Peace
 Ginger Rogers as Ramona Gladwyn
 Fred Allen as Steve Gladwyn
 Marilyn Monroe as Annabel Jones Norris
 David Wayne as Jeff Norris
 Eve Arden as Katie Woodruff
 Paul Douglas as Hector Woodruff
 Eddie Bracken as Willie Fisher
 Helene Stanley as Mary
 Mitzi Gaynor as Patricia 'Patsy' Reynolds Fisher

 Louis Calhern as Freddie Melrose
 Zsa Zsa Gabor as Eve Melrose
 James Gleason as Duffy
 Paul Stewart as Attorney Stone
 Jane Darwell as Mrs. Bush
 Lee Marvin as Pinky
 Gloria Talbott as Girl in dream sequence
 Richard Buckley as the radio producer Mr. H.D. Graves

Reception
Bosley Crowther of The New York Times wrote: "it must be said for Mr. Johnson and Mr. Goulding that they cut their capers well and came forth with a tailored entertainment that is one of the snappiest of the year." Crowther's favorite segment “most particularly because of the droll demonstration of confusion and beaming triumph that Louis Calhern gives—(is) the little drama in which a Texas millionaire confounds a scheming wife and her attorney who are trying to skin him with the old Army game. In this one, Mr. Calhern is delicious as he helplessly blinks and squirms through the obvious embarrassments of a frame-up and the subsequent bludgeonings of the kill. And then he is beautifully nimble as he finds his ace card and turns upon his relentless harassers…” However, Crowther errs in stating that “it's the only item of the lot in which the slight accident of manumission from matrimony is permitted to stand.” He overlooks Hector Woodruff's burning the letter and saying nothing to his wife.

Soundtrack

References

External links 
 
 
 
 
 

American black-and-white films
1950s English-language films
1952 films
1952 romantic comedy films
20th Century Fox films
Films directed by Edmund Goulding
American romantic comedy films
Comedy of remarriage films
Films with screenplays by Nunnally Johnson
American anthology films
Films scored by Cyril J. Mockridge
1950s American films